Tim Lewens (born 29 June 1974) is a professor in the history and philosophy of biology, medicine, and bioethics at the Department of History and Philosophy of Science at the University of Cambridge. Lewens is a Fellow of Clare College, where he serves as Director of Studies in Philosophy and he is a member of the academic staff and lecturer in the Department of History and Philosophy of Science (HPS).

Background
Lewens completed his PhD thesis at the Department of HPS, Cambridge University in 2001. He became a lecturer in History and Philosophy of Science at Cambridge soon after completing his doctoral thesis. He now serves as a governor at Exeter School where he was formerly a pupil. He was member of the Nuffield Council on Bioethics from 2009 to 2015 and a member of the Council's Working Party on human bodies in medicine and research (report published autumn 2011).

Research
Lewens has written and lectured extensively on evolution and his book on this subject, Organisms and Artifacts: Design in Nature and Elsewhere (2004) received wide critical acclaim, as did his 2007 monograph on Charles Darwin.

Honours
In 2008, Lewens was one of eleven recipients of the University of Cambridge's Pilkington Prize for the quality of his teaching.

Selected publications

References

External links 
 Tim Lewens, list of publications Department of HPS, Cambridge.

1974 births
Alumni of the University of Cambridge
People educated at Exeter School
Living people
Fellows of Clare College, Cambridge
Bioethicists
Philosophers of science
Historians of science
British historians
Philosophers of biology